"Low Happening" is the debut single from Howling Bells. First released as a digital download in 2005, followed by a CD release in 2006, its next appearance served as the third track on their debut album, Howling Bells. Re-issued in 2007 in digital download and CD format once more, as well as vinyl, this time with various remixes by several different artists.

Critical reception

Easily the band's most popular single to date, its frenzied beat aided by its stomping drums and fuzzy screaming guitar led it to being named, "Number 27 Track of the Year" in 2007, by popular British music magazine, NME, in their annual presentation of the year's best songs. A feat that was achieved a year earlier by "Setting Sun", when it was named "Number 47 Track of the Year" by the same publication.  Click Music'''s, Donna Dobson, called it, "one of the most interesting tunes of the year", and "a primal, almost raw, blending of blues with dirty rock 'n' roll". "Low Happening" played on season three's, episode thirteen entitled, "The Pot Stirrer", of the popular American television serial-drama, The OC.

Music videos

There are two music videos for this song.

2005 (Stage version)

The video was directed by Josh Louge for Mathematicsand was shot at the Enmore Theatre in Sydney, Australia. DP (Director of Photography) Francesco Biffone was awarded a 2005 silver ACS (Australian Cinematographers Society) Award for Cinematography. Captured on 35 mm film stock, it utilizes an aspect ratio of 1.85:1

It opens to the sight of a clapperboard and complete silence. Next is a stage right to stage left tracking shot from up-stage, behind the band, who at this point have started playing. As a whole the video is shot from a fixed position at a back angle, with a lot of it over the shoulder, and only one instance of it being hand-held. It isn't until the final verse and chorus that we are presented with the band from the front in which a tracking shot is pulling away from them, now playing in a set with a rear projection screen and props designed to mirror a forest.

2007 (Story version)

The video was directed by Dan Sully for Rebel Monk and was shot in Camden, London. Sully was nominated for 2008 UK MVA Best New Director. Captured on 35 mm film stock, it utilizes an aspect ratio of 1.85:1

A technique called stop motion was used briefly in the video. There are only a few instances of stable shots with the rest of it being all hand-held. The girl in the video is Lynsey Wright.

The camera scans a room, it's a mess, the walls are clad with nature-scened wallpaper, broken bottles along with a high heel shoe strew the floor. A young woman awakes in a bed, she's wrapped in blinking Christmas lights, her hand clutches burnt out sparklers, she's confused by it all. She gets up to look at herself in the mirror, she sees behind her a young man dressed as a skeleton passed out in the bathtub. She leaves and wanders the streets in and around Camden Lock listening to the song through her headphones, bemused by what she sees. The light in her eye and fast, sweeping motion of the camera gives the impression that she is obviously under the influence. She enters a diner in which members of the band patronize, she orders, attracts attention by swaying and twirling to her music. She sees a man sitting at a table, he's leaned up against the wall incoherent, she twists and plays with his tie only to push him away due to his inability to wake from a drunken coma. The video comes to a close when she appears at a fictitious Howling Bells'' joint at The Camden Barfly where she is overwhelmed by the music and dances to her favorite song. It's a Low Happening.

Track listings

CD digipack - LIBSP7183.2

"Low Happening"
"The Wild"
"This City's Burning"

CD - BELLACD136

"Low Happening"
"Low Happening"(Dogsend Squash Club remix)
"4 Play Documentary"(CD-ROM video)
"Low Happening"(CD-ROM video)

7" - BELLAV136

"Low Happening"
"Low Happening"(¡Forward, Russia! remix)

Digital downloads

"Low Happening"(The Presets remix)
"Low Happening"(Dogsend Squash Club remix)
"Low Happening"(Little People remix)
"Low Happening"(¡Forward, Russia! remix)

References

2005 singles
2007 singles
Howling Bells songs
2005 songs
Song recordings produced by Ken Nelson (British record producer)